This is a list of schools in Peterborough in the English county of Cambridgeshire.

State-funded schools

Primary schools

All Saints' CE Primary School, Dogsthorpe
Barnack CE Primary School, Barnack
The Beeches Primary School, Peterborough
Bishop Creighton Academy, Peterborough
Braybrook Primary Academy, Orton Goldhay
Brewster Avenue Infant School, Woodston
Castor CE Primary School, Castor
Discovery Primary Academy, Walton
Dogsthorpe Academy, Dogsthorpe
Dogsthorpe Infant School, Dogsthorpe
The Duke of Bedford Primary School, Thorney
Eye CE Primary School, Eye
Eyrescroft Primary School, Bretton
Fulbridge Academy, Peterborough
Gladstone Primary Academy, Peterborough
Gunthorpe Primary School, Peterborough
Hampton College, Hampton Vale
Hampton Hargate Primary School, Hampton Hargate
Hampton Lakes Primary School, Peterborough
Hampton Vale Primary Academy, Hampton Vale
Heritage Park Primary School, Park Farm
Highlees Primary School, Westwood
John Clare Primary School, Helpston
The King's (The Cathedral) School, Peterborough
Leighton Primary School, Orton Malborne
Lime Academy Abbotsmede, Peterborough
Lime Academy Parnwell, Parnwell
Lime Academy Watergall, Bretton
Longthorpe Primary School, Longthorpe
Manor Drive Primary Academy, Peterborough
Middleton Primary School, Bretton
Nene Valley Primary School, Peterborough
Newark Hill Academy, Peterborough
Newborough CE Primary School, Newborough
Northborough Primary School, Northborough
Norwood Primary School, Peterborough
Oakdale Primary School, Stanground
Old Fletton Primary School, Fletton
Ormiston Meadows Academy, Orton Brimbles
Orton Wistow Primary School, Orton Wistow
Paston Ridings Primary School, Paston
Peakirk-cum-Glinton CE Primary School, Glinton
Queen's Drive Infant School, Peterborough
Ravensthorpe Primary School, Peterborough
Sacred Heart RC Primary School, Bretton
St Augustine's CE Junior School, Peterborough
St Botolph's CE Primary School, Orton Longueville
St John Henry Newman RC Primary School, Peterborough
St John's Church School, Orton Goldhay
St Michael CE Primary School, Stanground
St Thomas More RC Primary School, Peterborough
Southfields Primary School, Stanground
Stanground St John's CE Primary School, Stanground
Thomas Deacon Academy, Peterborough
Thorpe Primary School, Netherton
Welbourne Primary Academy, Werrington
Welland Academy, Peterborough
Werrington Primary School, Werrington
West Town Primary Academy, Peterborough
William Law CE Primary School, Werrington
Winyates Primary School, Orton Goldhay
Wittering Primary School, Wittering
Woodston Primary School, Woodston

Secondary schools

Arthur Mellows Village College, Glinton
City of Peterborough Academy, Peterborough
Greater Peterborough UTC, Peterborough
Hampton College, Hampton Vale
Hampton Gardens, Peterborough
Jack Hunt School, Netherton
Ken Stimpson Community School, Werrington
The King's (The Cathedral) School, Peterborough
Manor Drive Secondary Academy, Peterborough
Nene Park Academy, Orton
Ormiston Bushfield Academy, Orton
Queen Katharine Academy, Walton
St John Fisher Catholic High School, Peterborough
Stanground Academy, Stanground
Thomas Deacon Academy, Peterborough

Special and alternative schools
City of Peterborough Academy Special School, Peterborough
Heltwate School, North Bretton
Lime Academy Orton, Orton Goldhay
Marshfields School, Dogsthorpe
Medeshamstede Academy, Peterborough
Nene Gate, Peterborough
Richard Barnes Academy, Peterborough

Further education
Peterborough College, Peterborough

Independent schools

Senior and all-through schools
Iqra Academy, Peterborough
The Peterborough School, Peterborough

Special and alternative schools
The Beeches Independent School, Peterborough
Park House, Thorney

References

External links
Performance tables for schools in Peterborough

Peterborough
Schools in Peterborough
Schools
Lists of buildings and structures in Cambridgeshire